Mhendhan is a Maldivian romantic drama web television series developed for Baiskoafu by Hussain Nooradeen. The series stars Aminath Nisha Rasheed, Ajnaaz Ali, Mariyam Shakeela, Ahmed Asim, Aishath Eshal Asim and Hussain Nooradeen in pivotal roles. The first episode of the series was released on Baiskoafu on 4 June 2019 on the occasion of Eid al-Fitr. It revolves around a young woman who relocates to her husband's house and is isolated from the society. Filming for the series took place in F. Nilandhoo.

Premise
A young couple Sofoora (Aminath Nisha Rasheed) and Aslam (Ajnaaz Ali), who are married for two years, relocate to the husband's island with their daughter, and struggle to mingle with the society when everyone from his family to friends had already abandoned him. Aslam moves back to Male' for a week in search of a job. Left alone, Sofoora suffers in the unfriendly environment.

Cast
 Aminath Nisha Rasheed as Sofoora
 Ajnaaz Ali as Aslam
 Mariyam Shakeela as Sakeena
 Ahmed Asim as Habeeb
 Aishath Eshal Asim 
 Hussain Nooradeen as Usman
 Samsunnisa Ibrahim
 Ahmed Shareef as Zameer
 Wajeeha Nasir as Usman's wife

Soundtrack

Release
The first episode among the five episodes was released on 4 June 2019 on the occasion of 1440 Eid al-Fitr. A new episode is scheduled to release on Tuesday at 21:00 of every week. The last episode of the series was released on 2 July 2019.

References

Serial drama television series
Maldivian web series